Salha "Mama" Bobo (1907–2001) was an American businesswoman, philanthropist, and matriarch of the Bobo family, based in Tampa, Florida.

Biography
Born in 1907 in Aleppo, Ottoman Syria, she lived there until the age of 14. She emigrated to the United States as a teenager and lived in New York City, Jacksonville, Florida, and Macon, Georgia, where her grandmother found her a husband when she was 16. She married Ralph Bobo, an Egyptian of Jewish heritage, and started in the grocery business with her husband in Georgia in 1922. The couple settled in Tampa in 1947, particularly Ybor City, Tampa, Florida. After they moved to Ybor City, the couple bought the Blue Ribbon Market. In 1949 three years later, Ralph died, and Salha continued to run the store with her children, later expanding to open a second store and three mini-marts. The Bobo family bought the property for the Blue Ribbon Supermarket in 1967, and later sold it to Austrian developers after operating it for decades.

In Tampa, she became locally famous as a cookbook author and businessperson.
She has been the feature of numerous print and TV news stories, as well as a documentary about her life and an oral history memoir Mashala, The Life and Times of Salha Bobo. Her cooking, blending Syrian and Southern American cuisine, has been covered in publications such as the Tampa Tribune. In 2002, her first grandchild published the cookbook Mezza & More, Syrian Fare With a Southern Flair, including hundreds of her recipes.

Family
Bobo died in 2001. She practiced Judaism, and was noted for remembering the birthdays of all of her children, grandchildren, and her 50 great-grandchildren even in her old age. She had seven children. As of 2005, the Bobo family had 100 relatives in the Tampa Bay area. Her great-grandson is actor Jonah Bobo.

References

External links
Wexler, Kathryn; Gibson, Linda; Schweitzer, Sarah; Washington, Wayne. "Blaze rips through Ybor City landmark", St. Petersburg Times, 12 August 2000.
Story on Salha Bobo's cuisine tradition, Tampa Tribune, 20 April 2005.

1907 births
2001 deaths
20th-century American businesspeople
20th-century American philanthropists
American people of Syrian-Jewish descent
American Sephardic Jews
Businesspeople from Tampa, Florida
Jews in the French Mandate for Syria and the Lebanon
People from Aleppo
Sephardi Jews in Ottoman Syria
Syrian emigrants to the United States
Syrian Jews